Otrov (English translation: Poison) is the fifth studio album of Bosnian singer Halid Bešlić. It was released in 1986.

Track listing
Otrov mi dajte (Give Me Poison)
Vraćam se majci u Bosnu (I Am Returning to my Mother in Bosnia)
Ona je opijum (She is Opium)
Limun žut (Yellow Lemon)
Mujo, Halil i Vila (Muyo, Halil and Vila)
Ja žalim ružu (I Regret the Rose)
Čarobna frula (The Magic Flute)
Hej, lijepa ženo (Hey, Beautiful Woman)

References

1986 albums
Halid Bešlić albums